The 2012–13 Rockford Rampage season was the first and only season of the new Rockford Rampage indoor soccer club. The Rampage, a Central Division team in the Professional Arena Soccer League, played their home games in the Victory Sports Complex in Loves Park, Illinois. The team was led by owner Saul Robles, head coach Jeff Kraft, and assistant coach Armando Sanchez.

Season summary
The team had mixed results in the regular season. The Rampage started the season with a four-game win streak but stumbled as the team's best players were signed by the Chicago Soul of the Major Indoor Soccer League. Ultimately, the team finished 7–9 and failed to qualify for the postseason.

The Rampage participated in the 2012–13 United States Open Cup for Arena Soccer. They lost to the Chicago Mustangs in the Wild Card round, abruptly ending their run in the tournament.

History
The previous indoor soccer franchise, founded in 2005 as the Rockford Thunder, was initially a member of the American Indoor Soccer League. They played home games at the Victory Sports Complex in Loves Park, Illinois. In August 2007, the team changed its name to "Rockford Rampage" to accommodate a women's fastpitch softball team, the Texas Thunder, which relocated to Rockford. The Rampage won the 2007–08 AISL Championship but the league folded soon after the season.

In 2008, the Rampage became a founding member of the National Indoor Soccer League and relocated to the Rockford MetroCentre in downtown Rockford, Illinois. The team continued in that league (renamed "Major Indoor Soccer League" in 2009) until going on hiatus in October 2010. Current Rampage head coach Jeff Kraft also led these previous incarnations of the team. The new Rockford Rampage joined the Professional Arena Soccer League in August 2012.

Off-field moves
In November 2012, the Rampage signed a marketing agreement that made Radioactive Energy Drink the team's "presenting sponsor" for this season. The beverage's logo was featured on the front of the team's uniform jerseys.

Roster moves
The team held an open tryout at the Victory Sports Complex on Saturday, September 22, 2012.

Awards and honors
On November 13, 2012, Rampage goalkeeper Ante Cop was named PASL Player of the Week for helping lead the team to a 3-0 start and for excellent defensive goalkeeping.

Schedule

Regular season

† Game also counts for US Open Cup, as listed in chart below.

2012–13 US Open Cup for Arena Soccer

References

External links
rockfordrampage.com Rockford Rampage official website

Rockford Rampage
Sports in Rockford, Illinois